The 1900 A&M Aggies football team represented the Agricultural and Mechanical College of Texas—now known as Texas A&M University—as an independent during the 1900 college football season. Led by second-year head coach W. A. Murray, the Aggies compiled a record of 2–2–1.

Schedule

References

Texas AandM
Texas A&M Aggies football seasons
exas AandM Aggies football